The Adventures of Harry Lime (broadcast in the United States as The Lives of Harry Lime) is an old-time radio programme produced in the United Kingdom during the 1951 to 1952 season. Orson Welles reprises his role of Harry Lime from the celebrated 1949 film The Third Man. The radio series is a prequel to the film, and depicts the many misadventures of con-artist Lime in a somewhat lighter tone than that of the film.

Production
The Adventures of Harry Lime is one of the most successful series created by prolific British radio producer Harry Alan Towers and his company Towers of London. Towers and Graham Greene, author of The Third Man, had the same literary agent, and Towers learned that Greene had not sold the rights to the character of Harry Lime to Alexander Korda when he sold Korda The Third Man. Towers quickly bought the rights to the character and in 1951 he put a syndicated radio series into production. Orson Welles reprised the role of Harry Lime in a series of adventures that preceded the story told in The Third Man.

Several episodes would begin with "The Third Man Theme" being played, abruptly cut off by an echoing gunshot. Then Welles would speak: "That was the shot that killed Harry Lime. He died in a sewer beneath Vienna, as those of you know who saw the movie The Third Man. Yes, that was the end of Harry Lime ... but it was not the beginning. Harry Lime had many lives ... and I can recount all of them. How do I know?  Very simple. Because my name is Harry Lime."

Although often cited as a BBC production, the series was one of a number produced and distributed independently by Towers of London and syndicated internationally.

Episodes
Only sixteen of the episodes were acquired and broadcast by the BBC in the UK. It was the first time that the BBC broadcast episodes of a dramatic series that it did not produce. The full series was syndicated to radio stations in the U.S.  

The con orchestrated by Welles' character in the episode "Horse Play" closely resembles that of the 1973 Robert Redford and Paul Newman film "The Sting." Both are based on the book "The Big Con" written by David W. Maurer which was published in 1940. 

The episode "Man of Mystery", written by Welles, was later expanded by him and served as the basic plot for his film Mr. Arkadin.

A recording of the 1951 "A Ticket to Tangiers" episode of The Lives of Harry Lime series is available on the Criterion Collection DVD edition of The Third Man. In addition, recordings of the 1952 episodes Man of Mystery, Murder on the Riviera and Blackmail is a Nasty Word are included on the Criterion Collection DVD The Complete Mr. Arkadin.

Novelisation

The Lives of Harry Lime
Fifteen episodes were adapted into a short story collection, The Lives of Harry Lime, published in the United Kingdom by Pocket Books in 1952. The book was credited to "Orson Welles and others", and Welles had been credited with writing the scripts of several episodes, but it is unclear whether or not he wrote the adaptations. 

Additionally, Harry Alan Towers has cast doubt on whether Welles even wrote the episodes he was credited with. He describes how the series started being written by a team of experienced American radio scriptwriters. When Welles discovered they were being paid $1,000 per script, he offered to write 6 scripts himself. The scripts were delivered and Towers duly paid Welles $6,000. Then one day, a man walked into Towers' office, demanding to be paid for the scripts which he had ghostwritten for Welles. When Welles was asked about it later, he smiled: "Don't pay him. They weren't very good scripts."

The episodes which were adapted into short stories were:

It's in the Bag by Orson Welles (Episode 30)
The Golden Fleece by Orson Welles (Episode 11)
Art is Long and Lime is Fleeting by Sigmund Miller (Episode 15)
Love Affair by Sigmund Miller (Episode 7)
See Naples and Live by Sigmund Miller (Episode 2)
Every Frame Has a Silver Lining by Robert Cenedella (Episode 13)
Paris is Not the Same by Joseph Cochran (Episode 49)
Five Thousand Pengoes and a Kiss by Carl Jampel (Episode 26)
The Hand of Glory by Jonquil Anthony (Episode 24)
The Hyacinth Patrol by Virginia Cooke (Episode 31)
Horseplay by Peter Lyon (Episode 17)
Work of Art by Bud Lesser (Episode 9)
Rogue's Holiday by Peter Lyon (Episode 8)
A Ticket to Tangier [sic] by Orson Welles (Episode 4)
An Old Moorish Custom by Irvan Ashkinazy (Episode 20)

Une Grosse Légume
Welles also tried to convert one episode script into a film script for producer Alexander Korda. When that fell through, the story was adapted into a novel and published in France as Une Grosse Légume in 1953. The novel was ghostwritten by Maurice Bessy and published under Welles's name. It has never been published in English.

Listen to
Archive.org: The Lives of Harry Lime (52 episodes)

See also
Orson Welles radio credits

References

American radio dramas
1951 radio programme debuts
1952 radio programme endings
Radio programs based on films
Works by Orson Welles